Caryocolum extremum is a moth of the family Gelechiidae. It is found in Nepal. The habitat consists of primary montane oak forests.

The length of the forewings is about 5.5 mm. The costal part of the forewings is dark brown and the dorsal part is mid-brown mottled with a few white scales. The hindwings are dark brown. Adults have been recorded on wing from late May to mid-July.

References

Moths described in 1988
extremum
Moths of Asia